As Time Goes By is a duet album recorded by Bobby Vinton and George Burns; it was Vinton's thirty-seventh and final studio album. The first three songs are recorded by Vinton and Burns as duets.  The fourth, fifth, and tenth tracks are solos by Burns, while the sixth to ninth tracks are solos by Vinton.

At the end of the song "As Time Goes By," Burns makes a reference to the film Casablanca by saying, "Y'know, Bobby, this could be the start of a beautiful friendship."

The song "Gracie" was written in memory of Burns' wife, Gracie Allen.

Track listing

Personnel
Adapted from AllMusic.

 Dennis Belfield – bass
 Susan Boyd – background vocals
 George Burns – performer
 Charles Bush – photography
 Pat Coil – piano
 Irving Fine – executive producer
 Bob Glaub – bass
 Jim Haas – background vocals
 Keith Heffner – assistant engineer, programming
 John Jorgenson – guitar
 Jon Joyce – background vocals
 Laurence Juber – arranger, guitar
 Bob Kearney – engineer
 Paul Leim – drums
 Gayle Levant – harp
 Michael Lloyd – arranger, engineer, guitar, mixing, producer, background vocals
 Chris Lytton – background vocals
 Bobby Martin – saxophone
 Michael J. Pick – executive producer
 John Valentino – assistant engineer
 Bobby Vinton – vocals
 Brian Zsupnick – drums

References

1992 albums
Bobby Vinton albums
Curb Records albums
Albums produced by Michael Lloyd (music producer)
George Burns albums